Jessica Pegula defeated Maria Sakkari in the final, 6–2, 6–3 to win the women's singles title. It was her first WTA 1000 title, and she saved three match points en route, in her second-round match against Elena Rybakina. Pegula also defeated four consecutive former major champions en route to the title – Rybakina, Bianca Andreescu, Sloane Stephens, and Victoria Azarenka.

This was the first time that Guadalajara hosted a WTA 1000-level event, having hosted the previous year's WTA Finals.

Seeds
The top eight seeds received a bye into the second round.

Draw

Finals

Top half

Section 1

Section 2

Bottom half

Section 3

Section 4

Qualifying

Seeds

Qualifiers

Lucky losers

Draw

First qualifier

Second qualifier

Third qualifier

Fourth qualifier

Fifth qualifier

Sixth qualifier

Seventh qualifier

Eighth qualifier

References

External links 
Qualifying draw
Main draw

Guadalajara Open Akron